Sollentuna may refer to:

 Sollentuna Municipality, a Swedish municipality
 Sollentuna Station, a station of the Stockholm commuter rail
 Sollentuna Hundred, a former Swedish geographic division
 Sollentuna Köping, a subdivision of the Sollentuna Hundred
 Sollentuna Kontrakt, a subdivision of the Church of Sweden Diocese of Stockholm
 Sollentuna Parish, a parish in Sollentuna Kontrakt
 Sollentuna Church, one of the church buildings in Sollentuna Parish
 Sollentuna Party, a local political party, active in the Sollentuna Municipality
 Sollentuna FK, a Swedish association football club